Whole sour cabbage (literally: "cabbage soured in heads") is a fermented vegetable food preserve,  popular in Eastern European and Balkan cuisines. It is similar to sauerkraut, with the difference that it is prepared through the lacto-fermentation for several weeks of whole heads of cabbage, not separate leaves or grated mass. No vinegar or boiling is required. It is a homemade food preserve, commonly prepared in large barrels filled with whole cabbage heads and water salted with sea salt.

Preparation

After the external leaves and core have been removed, the cabbage heads are salted, packed into the barrel as densely as possible (another reason why a round form is required) and covered with salted water (4–6% of salt). A heavy load (a rock, for example) is placed above, to keep them under the water, in anaerobic conditions. From time to time the water has to be reversed (flushed from the bottom of the barrel and then again sluiced onto the top), adding more (always with salt) if necessary. A higher salinity makes the fermentation slower, while an insufficient salinity makes it unsafe. Higher temperatures require a higher salinity. The fermentation should be done at 16-22 °C. The best temperature is 18-20 °C. A cabbage fermented at a lower temperature has a better fragrance. The best known microorganisms involved in the process include Leuconostoc mesenteroides, Lactobacterium brevis, Streptococcus faecalis, Pediococcus cerevisiae and Lactobacterium plantarum.

Use

Sour cabbage is a popular Bosnian, Bulgarian, Croatian, Macedonian, Romanian, and Serbian food, consumed mainly during the winter half of the year, both raw or cooked. Raw, it is a very popular winter salad, usually served dusted with pepper powder (aleva paprika) and/or black pepper, but also as-is. In cooking, it is used for sarma, and in other dishes, such as podvarak.

See also

References

Pickles
Bulgarian cuisine
Serbian cuisine
Salted foods
Plant-based fermented foods
Vegan cuisine
Condiments
Cabbage dishes
Ancient dishes